Shōshin Kuwayama  (桑山正進 Kuwayama Shōshin, born September 8, 1938) is a Japanese historian and archaeologist. He has been Professor Emeritus at the Institute for Research in the Humanities at Kyoto University, and is credited with contributing to the "formation of an entire generation
of scholars in Japan and abroad". Kuwayama is one of the leading scholars in the area of historical interactions between China and India, and especially researches the southern Hindukush region. He led extensive archaeological projects in Afghanistan and Pakistan.

Works
 
 
 
 Kuwayama S. 1990. The Buddha's Bowl in Gandhāra and Relevant Problems. Pages 946–77 in M. Taddei (ed), South Asian Archaeology 1987, 2. Rome: IsMEO.
 Kuwayama S. 2006. Pilgrimage Route Changes and the Decline of Gandhāra. Pages 107–34 in P. Brancaccio and K. Behrendt (eds), Gandharan Buddhism: Archaeology, Art, Texts. Vancouver: University of British Columbia Press.
 Kuwayama Shōshin 桑山正進 and Hakamaya Noriaki 袴谷憲昭. 1981. Genjō 玄奘 [Xuanzang]. Tokyo: Daizō Shuppan 大蔵出版.

References

20th-century Japanese historians
Academic staff of Kyoto University
21st-century Japanese historians